Cedar is part of the English common name of many trees and other plants, particularly those of the genus Cedrus.

Some botanical authorities consider the Old-World Cedrus the only "true cedars".  Many other species worldwide with similarly aromatic wood, including several species of genera Calocedrus, Thuja, and Chamaecyparis in the Pacific Northwest of North America, are referred to as "false cedars".

Plants called "cedar" include:

Family Pinaceae 
Cedrus, common English name cedar, a genus of coniferous trees in the plant family Pinaceae
Lebanon cedar, Cedrus libani, a cedar native to Lebanon, western Syria and south-central Turkey
Atlas cedar, Cedrus atlantica, a cedar native to the Atlas Mountains of Morocco and Algeria
Deodar cedar, Cedrus deodara, a cedar native to the western Himalayas
Cyprus cedar, Cedrus brevifolia, found in the island of Cyprus's Cedar Valley in the Troodos Mountains
Siberian pine (Pinus sibirica), occasionally erroneously referred to as Siberian cedar

Family Cupressaceae 
Atlantic white cedar, Chamaecyparis thyoides
Bermuda cedar, Juniperus bermudiana, a species of juniper endemic to Bermuda
Chilean cedar, Austrocedrus chilensis
Chinese cedarwood oil comes from Cupressus funebris, the Chinese weeping cypress
Clanwilliam cedar, Widdringtonia cedarbergensis, a species of cypress endemic to the Cederberg mountains of South Africa
Eastern red cedar, Juniperus virginiana, a species of juniper native to eastern North America
Eastern white cedar, also northern white cedar, Thuja occidentalis, native to eastern North America.
Calocedrus, the incense cedars, a genus native to western North America, Eastern Asia 
Japanese cedar, Cryptomeria japonica; known as 杉 (Sugi) in Japanese
Mexican white cedar, Cupressus lusitanica, a species of cypress native to Mexico and Central America
Mountain cedar, source of Texas cedarwood oil, Juniperus ashei, an evergreen shrub native to northeastern Mexico and the south central United States
New Zealand cedar, Libocedrus bidwillii
Persian cedar, Cupressus sempervirens
Port Orford-cedar, Chamaecyparis lawsoniana, or Lawson cypress, California, Oregon
Prickly cedar, sharp cedar, Juniperus oxycedrus, native to the Mediterranean region
Western red cedar, Thuja plicata, a cypress of the Pacific northwest
Yellow cedar, Cupressus nootkatensis, also called Alaska cedar

Family Meliaceae 
Spanish cedar, Cedrela odorata
Cigar-box cedar, Cedrela
Australian red cedar, Toona ciliata
Ceylon cedar or Melia azedarach, a species of deciduous tree native to India, southern China and Australia

Other families 
Bay cedar, Suriana (Surianaceae)
Running cedar or ground cedar, various species of clubmosses (Lycopodiopsida) in the genus Diphasiastrum
Saltcedar, Tamarix (Caryophyllaceae)
Stinking cedar, Torreya taxifolia (Cephalotaxaceae)
Warren River cedar or native cedar, Taxandria juniperina (Myrtaceae)
White cedar, Tabebuia heterophylla (Bignoniaceae)

References

Set index articles on plant common names